Josaphat can refer to:

People 
 Jehoshaphat, in the Bible, fourth king of the Kingdom of Judah
 Josaphat, a Christian saint of India, appearing in the legend of Barlaam and Josaphat
 Giosafat Barbaro (1413–94), Venetian explorer and diplomat
 Josephat T. Benoit (1900–76), mayor of Manchester, New Hampshire
 Josaphat Celestin, Haitian-American politician, North Miami's first black mayor
 Josaphat Chichkov, Bulgarian priest, rector and teacher
 J.-J. Gagnier (Jean-Josaphat Gagnier), Canadian conductor, composer, and musician
 Josaphata Hordashevska, Ukrainian Greek-Catholic nun
 Blessed Josaphat Kotsylovsky, Ukrainian Greek Catholic bishop and martyr
 Josaphat Kuntsevych (c.1580 – 1623), Belarusian martyr and saint of the Ruthenian Catholic Church
 Josaphat-Robert Large, Haitian-American poet, novelist and art critic
 Yuz Asaf, a sage buried at Srinagar, Kashmir, whose name is interpreted as "Josaphat" by Christians
 Israel Beer Josaphat, the birth name of Paul Reuter
 Josaphat (Metropolis) is a main character in Fritz Lang's Metropolis (1927 film)

Churches 
 St. Josaphat Cathedral (disambiguation)
 St. Josaphat's Church (disambiguation)

Other places 
 Valley of Josaphat, mentioned in the biblical book of Joel
 Josaphat Park, a public park located in the municipality of Schaerbeek in Brussels
 Planet Nine, which has been called by its original proponents: "Jehoshaphat", "George", and "Phattie".

Other uses 
 Barlaam and Josaphat (book), several books dealing with the lives of Saints Barlaam and Josaphat
 Order of Saint Basil the Great, also known as the Basilian Order of Saint Josaphat, monastic religious order of the Greek Catholic Church
 Priestly Society of Saint Josaphat
 Ukrainian Catholic Eparchy of Saint Josaphat in Parma, a diocese of the Ukrainian Greek Catholic Church

See also
Jehoshaphat (disambiguation)